Miles Hilton-Barber is a British adventurer who, despite being blind, undertakes a variety of expeditions all around the world to raise awareness and money for a charity organization, and blind people in general. His recent trips include flying from London to Sydney in a micro-light, climbing Mont Blanc and running across the Gobi Desert.

References

 
 
 
 
 
 BBC: Is this the world's most adventurous blind man?

External links
 Official website

British blind people
Living people
Year of birth missing (living people)